Tylomelania sinabartfeldi is a species of freshwater snail with an operculum, an aquatic gastropod mollusk in the family Pachychilidae.

The specific name sinabartfeldi is in honor of Sina Bartfeld, who contributed to supporting the malacological research.

Distribution 
This species occurs in the Larona River, in Sulawesi, Indonesia. Its type locality is the Larona River.

Ecology 
The females of Tylomelania sinabartfeldi usually have 11-67 embryos in their brood pouch.

References

External links
 

sinabartfeldi
Gastropods described in 2008